Hồ Sỹ Sâm (born 2 September 1993) is a Vietnamese footballer who plays as a midfielder for V.League 1 club Sông Lam Nghệ An.

Sỹ Sâm is known for being an exceptionally hardworking and patient player who waited a long time before he could finally break through his home town club.

References 

1993 births
Living people
Vietnamese footballers
Association football midfielders
V.League 1 players
Song Lam Nghe An FC players
People from Nghệ An province